The Claremont Graduate University (CGU) is a private, all-graduate research university in Claremont, California. Founded in 1925, CGU is a member of the Claremont Colleges which includes five undergraduate (Pomona College, Claremont McKenna College, Harvey Mudd College, Scripps College, Pitzer College) and two graduate (CGU and Keck Graduate Institute of Applied Life Sciences) institutions of higher education.

The university is organized into seven separate units: the School of Arts & Humanities; School of Community & Global Health; Drucker School of Management; School of Educational Studies; the School of Social Science, Policy, & Evaluation; the Center for Information Systems & Technology; and the Institute of Mathematical Sciences. It is classified among "R2: Doctoral Universities – High research activity."

History 
Founded in 1925, CGU was the second of the Claremont Colleges to form, following Pomona College and preceding Scripps College. The school has undergone several name changes since its inception. After being called Claremont University College for thirty-seven years, in 1962 the school officially became known as Claremont Graduate School and University Center. Five years later, in 1967, the name was again changed to Claremont University Center, and in 1998 it acquired the name Claremont Graduate University.

The Claremont Colleges were designed to incorporate the Oxford Model of higher education. Instead of one large university composed of several separate schools, the Claremont Colleges are made up of different institutions designed around differing theories of pedagogy. CGU was founded upon the principle that graduate education is separate and distinct from undergraduate education. Students discover and cultivate their disciplines during undergraduate course work; at CGU students continue cultivation of their own disciplines, but are also expected to augment this with research that incorporates other disciplines as well. This is called "Transdisciplinarity" and is an essential component of Claremont Graduate University's functioning theory of pedagogy.

The school is home to more than 2,000 master's and PhD students, as well as approximately 200 full and part-time faculty members. The Carnegie Foundation for the Advancement of Teaching has classified Claremont Graduate University as a CompDoc/NMedVet: Comprehensive doctoral (no medical/veterinary) with high research activity. Its seven academic units and other related programs and institutes award master's and/or doctoral degrees in 31 disciplines. Enrollment is limited and classes are small. In 2018, the university also introduced its first online master's degree programs.

Academics

Claremont Colleges
Among the contiguous CGU, Keck Graduate Institute of Applied Life Sciences, and undergraduate colleges (Pomona, Claremont McKenna, Harvey Mudd, Scripps, and Pitzer), cross-registration is free, and the members share libraries, health care, security, and other facilities.

Schools

Arts & Humanities 

The School of Arts and Humanities includes departments in the fields of Art, Arts Management, Religion, History, English, Music, Cultural Studies, Archival Studies, Media Studies, and Applied Women's Studies. These subjects have an interest in interdisciplinary studies that provide disciplinary depth as well as cross-disciplinary flexibility.

In the Department of Religion, students can earn a degree with a focus in Mormon Studies, Catholicism, Islamic Studies, History of Christianity, Hebrew Bible, Indic Studies, Coptic Studies, Zoroastrianism; additional programs include Women's Studies in Religion, Religion and American Politics, Ethics and Culture, and Philosophy of Religion and Theology.

Social Science, Policy & Evaluation 

SSSPE encompasses the Division of Politics and Economics and the Division of Behavioral and Organizational Sciences. SSSPE offers M.A. and Ph.D. programs in Political Science, American Politics & Political Philosophy, Public Policy & Evaluation, International Studies (Comparative and/or World Politics), International Political Economy, Economics, Global Commerce & Finance, and joint degrees with MBA. SSSPE offers the first Ph.D. and M.A. concentrations in the Western United States focused on the Science of Positive Psychology.. The program also offers the first Ph.D. degree in neuroeconomics which bridges economics, psychology, and public policy.

Community & Global Health 
Formed in 2008, the School of Community and Global Health is dedicated to generating scientific knowledge about the causes and prevention of disease and the improvement of health and well-being of diverse populations locally and globally. The school is responsible for training professional practitioners to translate prevention science into improved practice and policy for health promotion and disease prevention at the individual, community and global levels.

The school offers a Ph.D. in Health Promotion Sciences, DrPh., M.P.H. degrees; the M.P.H. program, which has a variety of concentrations, is accredited by the Council on Education for Public Health. As of 2019, the school enrolled over 140 students, had a 12:1 student-faculty ratio, and had over 90 alumni.

Drucker School of Management 
The Peter F. Drucker and Masatoshi Ito School of Management follows the Drucker philosophy based on people (management as a human enterprise, as a liberal art) and looks beyond traditional perceptions of economics, instead espousing management as a liberal art, focusing on social theory, history, and sustainability.

Educational Studies 

The School of Educational Studies offers the M.A. and Ph.D in Teaching, Learning and Culture, Education Policy, Evaluation and Reform, Higher Education/Student Affairs, Special Education and Urban Educational Leadership.

Center for Information Systems & Technology 

CISAT was founded in 1983 by Paul Gray as an independent entity.  Unconstrained by a typical business school structure, students are allowed to focus specifically on those topics associated with IS&T. The school provides a solid technical grounding in IT systems, while at the same time, addressing the significant management challenges to designing, developing, implementing and assessing IT systems in applied business and governmental settings.

Institute of Mathematical Sciences 

The Institute of Mathematical Sciences offers a variety of masters and doctoral degrees, and maintains a strong applied research component through its internationally recognized Engineering and Industrial Applied Mathematics Clinic, offering students first-hand experience in solving significant problems in applied mathematics for business and industry clients. IMS also provides joint programs in financial engineering, computational science, and computational and systems biology.

Other programs and institutes

Botany Department 
In conjunction with the Rancho Santa Ana Botanic Garden, Claremont Graduate University offers master's and doctoral degrees in botany emphasizing systematics and evolution of higher plants.  Subfields include monographic and revisionary studies, cytotaxonomy, molecular systematics, phylogenetics, plant anatomy and comparative aspmorphology, ecology, plant geography, and reproductive biology.

Peter F. Drucker Institute 
Peter Drucker Institute is a think tank established to advance the principles of Peter F. Drucker.

Museum Leadership Institute 

The Museum Leadership Institute at Claremont Graduate University is a leading source of continuing professional development for current and future leaders of museums and other nonprofit institutions.

CGU also has a number of other institutes and affiliations, including Sotheby's Institute of Art, the Claremont Evaluation Center, the Quality of Life Research Center, and the Institute for Democratic Renewal, among several others.

Campus

Location and buildings

In July 2007, CNN/Money magazine ranked Claremont as one of the top 5 places to live in the United States.

Harper Hall
Harper Hall is the oldest building on CGU's campus, originally housing the graduate library. It is now the administration building centralizing CGU's student and administrative functions. Classrooms and study areas take up a majority of Harper Hall's lower level.

Stauffer Hall and Albrecht auditorium

The Academic computing building
The ACB is a three-story,  facility completed in 1985, which was renovated in 2009 to include the third floor. It houses academic computing resources, the School of Social Science, Policy, & Evaluation, the Center for Information Systems and Technology, two computer labs, and the Kay E-Health Center. It is also home to the Paul Gray PC Museum.

Ron W. Burkle Building
The Ron W. Burkle building was completed in 1998. Named after CGU fellow Ronald Burkle, it is currently home to the Peter Drucker and Masatoshi Ito Graduate School of Management. It is a three-story,  facility housing offices, classrooms and lecture halls, the Drucker Library and the Drucker Institute.

The CGU Art Building
The CGU Art Building is home to two galleries, The East Gallery and the Peggy Phelps Gallery. During the semester the galleries feature work by current MFA students as well as special exhibits curated by professors, featuring the work of local artists. The art building has an independent studio space for each student measuring 22 by 12 feet. Once a year, the art building and all of the studios are opened to the public in an event called "Open Studios."

Notable places on campus

Paul Gray PC Museum
The Paul Gray PC Museum is a computer museum at Claremont Graduate University. It is named in honor of the late Paul Gray, a former professor at the university who founded CGU's information sciences program, and is located in the Center for Information Systems and Technology. , the museum is showing the "Best PCs Ever", based on the article "The 25 Greatest PCs of All Time" published by PC World.

The Kingsley & Kate Tufts Poetry Awards
Claremont Graduate University is home to the Kinglsey Tufts Poetry Award. The Award is presented annually for a work by an emerging poet. The $100,000 award was established in 1992 by Kate Tufts to honor her late husband, poet and writer Kingsley Tufts. It is the largest monetary prize in the nation for a mid-career poet. A year later, the $10,000 Kate Tufts Discovery Award was established to recognize a poet of promise.

Noted people

Alumni and faculty

Presidents 
James A. Blaisdell (1925–1936)
William S. Ament, Acting President (1935–1937) Note: Overlap in years because Ament was hired July 1, 1935, while Blaisdell was on sabbatical.
Russell Story (1937–1942)
Robert J. Bernard (1959–1963) Note: Bernard ran the university from 1942 to 1959 under the title administrative director.
William W. Clary, Acting President (1963)
Louis T. Benezet (1963–1970)
Howard R. Bowen (1970–1971)
Barnaby Keeney (1971–1976)
Joseph B. Platt (1976–1981)
John D. Maguire (1981–1998)
Steadman Upham (1998–2004)
William Everhart, Interim President (2004–2005)
Robert Klitgaard (2005–2009)
Joseph C. Hough, Jr. Interim President (2009–2010)
Deborah A. Freund (2010–2014)
Robert Schult, Interim President (2015–2016)
Jacob Adams, Interim President (2017–2018)
Len Jessup, President (2018–)

References

Bibliography
Bernard, Robert J., An Unfinished Dream: A Chronicle of the Group Plan of the Claremont Colleges; The Castle Press, 1982.
Blaisdell, James Arnold, The Story of a Life: An Autobiography; Penn Lithographics, 1984.
Clary, William W., The Claremont Colleges: A History of the Development of the Claremont Group Plan; The Castle Press, 1970.

External links 

 
 

 
Claremont Colleges
Graduate schools in the United States
Universities and colleges in Los Angeles County, California
Schools accredited by the Western Association of Schools and Colleges
1925 establishments in California
Educational institutions established in 1925
University, Claremont Graduate
San Gabriel Valley
Private universities and colleges in California